The Westside Theatre is an off-Broadway performance space at 407 West 43rd Street between Ninth and Tenth Avenues in the Hell's Kitchen neighborhood of Manhattan, New York City. The building houses two auditoriums: the Upstairs Theatre, which seats 270, and the Downstairs Theatre, which features a thrust stage and has a seating capacity of 249. Formerly known as the Chelsea Theatre Center and the Westside Arts Theatre, the building was renovated in 1991.

History
The Romanesque Revival style building, designed by Henry Franklin Kilburn, was constructed in 1890 for the Second German Baptist Church, which it housed until the 1960s. The site was then occupied by various nightclubs until its establishment as a theatre in 1976.

Selected past productions

Upstairs

Downstairs

References

Further reading
 "Religion, Disco, Death and Drama – Westside Theatre's History Reads Like a Play in 3 Acts" by Phil O'Brien, W42ST, September 21, 2021

External links 

 
 
 

Off-Broadway theaters
Theatres in Manhattan
Hell's Kitchen, Manhattan
Romanesque Revival architecture in New York City
Theatres completed in 1976
Churches completed in 1890
Former Baptist church buildings in the United States
Closed churches in New York City